Ingmar Berga (born 17 July 1984) is a Dutch male marathon speed skater and inline speed skater.

Honours

Speed skating
 2006-07 – 1st at one stage in the Essent Cup 2006-07
 2006-07 – 3rd at one stage in the Essent Cup 2006-07
 2006-07 – 1st at the Dutch artificial track national marathon championships
 2006-07 – 1st in first Dutch natural track race in Haaksbergen

Inline speed skating
 ???? - 2nd in team pursuit at the European Championships

References

External links
 
 Ingmar Berga at SpeedskatingResults.com
 
 Fan site for Ingmar Berga at SkateLog.com

1984 births
Living people
Dutch male speed skaters
Dutch roller skaters
People from Hoogeveen
Sportspeople from Drenthe